Do You Hear What I Hear?: Christmas with Anita Bryant is an album by Anita Bryant released by Columbia Records in 1967.

The album landed on the Billboards Best Bets For Christmas album chart, reaching #25.Anita Bryant, Christmas with Anita Bryant Chart Position  Retrieved July 26, 2013 It was released on CD in 2017 by Sony Mod.

 Track listing 
 "Do You Hear What I Hear?" (Gloria Shayne Baker, Noël Regney)
 "In a Humble Place" (Gloria Shayne Baker)	
 "The First Noel" (Traditional)
 "Mary's Lullaby (Sleep, Baby Sleep)" (Noël Regney)
 "The Story of Christmas" (Lor Crane, Desiree Troiano)
 "Silent Night, Holy Night" (Franz Xaver Gruber, Joseph Mohr)
 "O Little Town of Bethlehem" (Phillips Brooks, Lewis Redner)
 "It Came Upon a Midnight Clear" (Edmund Sears, Richard Storrs Willis)
 "O Holy Night" (Adolphe Adam, Placide Cappeau)
 "O Come All Ye Faithful" (John Francis Wade, Frederick Oakeley)
 "Away in a Manger"

Chart positionsAlbum'

References

1967 albums
1967 Christmas albums
Christmas albums by American artists
Columbia Records Christmas albums
Pop Christmas albums
Anita Bryant